Dr. Tommy Sihotang S.H., LL.M (born 3 December 1957) is a noted Indonesian lawyer  of Batak descent. Coming from a lower-class family background, Tommy is now a professional and one of the leading Indonesian attorneys, involved in notable cases such as the case in East Timor. He is the current leader of the Christian Democratic Party Indonesia. He is mainly active in Human Rights law.

Personal life 
Sihotang grew up in a Christian family with twelve other siblings, as a devoted Christian until today. He was raised in a small town of Pematang Siantar, North Sumatra. Later moved to the capital city of Indonesia, in Jakarta along with his family. Sihotang then received his bachelor's degree in Law (Sarjana Hukum) at Universitas Jaya Baya, Faculty of Law in 1986. Later he moved to Sheffield, England with his wife and two children and obtained his Master's degree (LL.M) in International, Commercial, and European Law at the University of Sheffield for less than one and a half year in 1999. In 2007, he graduated his doctorate certificate at Universitas Padjadjaran (Bandung)  with an excellent thesis resulting a cum laude honor. Sihotang is also the current leader of the Indonesian Christian Democratic Party. Sihotang still manages time to lecture at Universitas Atma Jaya  He has produced two books that was supported by the Indonesian Defense Minister, Juwono Sudarsono entitled "Ketika Komandan Didakwa Melanggar Hak Asasi Manusia" and "Hukum Acara di Pengadilan Hak Asasi Manusia".

References

1957 births
People of Batak descent
Indonesian Christians
20th-century Indonesian lawyers
Living people
21st-century Indonesian lawyers